Celtis biondii is a species of hackberry native to China, Taiwan, Korea, and Japan. It prefers to grow on limestone in the floristic assemblage that is thought to also include wild Ginkgo biloba.

References

 

biondii
Trees of China
Trees of Korea
Trees of Japan
Trees of Taiwan
Plants described in 1910